Revuelto Gramajo (English: Gramajo Scramble) is a common hash dish in Argentine cuisine consisting of fried julienned potatoes, ham and eggs. The dish can be adapted to use any ingredients the cook may have on hand, including peas, other fresh vegetables, fish, pork, and other meats. It is common in Buenos Aires, and has been described as one of the city's "quintessential" dishes. French fries are sometimes used as an ingredient in the dish.

Etymology
Revuelto Gramajo is named after Colonel Artemio Gramajo (June 1838 – 1914), a former government administrator of Buenos Aires, in Canelones, Uruguay

See also

 List of Argentine dishes

References

Further reading

External links
 Revuelto Gramajo. Cqap.info. 

Argentine cuisine
Culture in Buenos Aires